Welcome to My World is a compilation album by American singer and musician Elvis Presley, released by RCA Records on March 17, 1977,  five months before his death. The album was certified gold on September 30, 1977 and platinum on January 14, 1983 by the RIAA.

Content
Due to Elvis' infrequent studio recording sessions during this period and  thus lacking any new material from Elvis, RCA Records assembled this album, consisting of, with one exception, all previously released tracks. Your Cheatin' Heart was recorded in 1958, nineteen years earlier. 
The one previously unissued track, "I Can't Stop Loving You", was recorded during the afternoon performance at Madison Square Garden on June 10, 1972; the remainder of the concert remained unreleased until 1997 when RCA issued the complete concert as An Afternoon in the Garden.

Track listing

Certifications

References

External links

APL1-2274 Welcome to My World  Guide part of The Elvis Presley Record Research Database

1977 compilation albums
Elvis Presley compilation albums
RCA Records compilation albums